Jiezi (Mandarin: 街子镇) is a town in Wusheng County, Guang'an, Sichuan, China. In 2010, Jiezi had a total population of 15,429: 7,866 males and 7,563 females: 3,061 aged under 14, 10,248 aged between 15 and 65 and 2,120 aged over 65.

References 

Towns in Sichuan
Guang'an